Marcin Lijewski (born 21 September 1977) is a retired Polish team handball player, who was playing on the Poland men's national handball team. He currently is a manager. He received a silver medal with the Polish team at the 2007 World Men's Handball Championship in Germany and a bronze medal at the 2009 World Men's Handball Championship in Croatia. He participated at the 2008 Summer Olympics, where Poland finished 5th.

His brother Krzysztof Lijewski is playing for the Polish national team and for PGE Vive Kielce.

References

External links

1977 births
Living people
People from Krotoszyn
Polish male handball players
Polish handball coaches
Olympic handball players of Poland
Handball players at the 2008 Summer Olympics
Wisła Płock (handball) players
Sportspeople from Greater Poland Voivodeship